Junichande is a rural municipality located in Jajarkot District of Karnali Province of Nepal.

Majhkot, Garkhakot, Daha and Kortrang which previously were all separate Village development committees merged to form this new local level body. Fulfilling the requirement of the new Constitution of Nepal 2015, Ministry of Federal Affairs and General Administration replaced all old VDCs and Municipalities into 753 new local level bodies.

The rural municipality is divided into total eleven wards and the headquarters of this newly formed rural municipality is situated at Majhkot.

Demographics
At the time of the 2011 Nepal census, 95.6% of the population in Junichande Rural Municipality spoke Nepali, 3.2% Kham, 1.1% Magar and 0.1% Maithili as their first language; 0.1% spoke other languages.

In terms of ethnicity/caste, 38.7% were Chhetri, 22.9% Kami, 21.4% Thakuri, 5.6% Damai/Dholi, 4.9% Magar, 2.9% Sanyasi/Dasnami, 1.3% Hill Brahmin, 1.1% Sarki, 0.5% Badi and 0.7% others.

In terms of religion, 98.0% were Hindu and 2.0% Christian.

References

External links
 Official website

Populated places in Jajarkot District
Rural municipalities in Karnali Province
Rural municipalities of Nepal established in 2017